Circuit Zandvoort, known for sponsorship reasons as CM.com Circuit Zandvoort, and previously known as Circuit Park Zandvoort until 2017, is a  motorsport race track located in the dunes north of Zandvoort, the Netherlands, near the North Sea coast line. It returned to the Formula One calendar in 2021 as the location of the revived Dutch Grand Prix.

History

1930s to mid 1980s

There were plans for races at Zandvoort before World War II: the first street race was held on 3 June 1939. However, a permanent race track was not constructed until after the war, using communications roads built by the occupying German army. Contrary to popular belief John Hugenholtz cannot be credited with the design of the Zandvoort track, although he was involved as the chairman of the Nederlandse Automobiel Ren Club (Dutch Auto Racing Club) before becoming the first track director in 1949. Instead, it was 1927 Le Mans winner, S. C. H. "Sammy" Davis who was brought in as a track design advisor in July 1946 although the layout was partly dictated by the existing roads.

The first race on the circuit, the Prijs van Zandvoort, took place on 7 August 1948. The race was renamed the Grote Prijs van Zandvoort (Zandvoort Grand Prix) in 1949, then the Grote Prijs van Nederland (Dutch Grand Prix) in 1950. The 1952 race was the first to be run as a round of the World Championship, albeit to Formula Two regulations rather than Formula One regulations like all the European rounds of the championship that year; a similar situation also applied to the 1953. There was no Dutch Grand Prix in 1954, 1956 or 1957, but 1955 saw the first true Formula One race as part of the Drivers' Championship. The Dutch Grand Prix returned in 1958 and remained a permanent fixture on the F1 calendar (with the exception of 1972) until , when it was held for the last time in the 20th century.

Since 1985
To solve a number of problems that had made it impossible to develop and upgrade the track, the most important one being noise pollution for the inhabitants of the part of Zandvoort closest to the track, the track management adopted and developed a plan to move the most southern part of the track away from the housing estate and rebuild a more compact track in the remaining former 'infield'. In January 1987 this plan got the necessary 'green light' when it was formally approved by the Provincial Council of North Holland. However, only a couple of months later a new problem arose: the company that commercially ran the circuit (CENAV), called in the receiver and went out of business, marking the end of "Circuit van Zandvoort". Again the track, owned by the municipality of Zandvoort, was in danger of being permanently lost for motorsports. However, a new operating company, the Stichting Exploitatie Circuit Park, was formed and started work at the realization of the track's reconstruction plans.

In 1995, CPZ (Circuit Park Zandvoort) got the "A Status" of the government of the Netherlands and began building an international Grand Prix Circuit. One of the major events that is held at the circuit, along with DTM and A1GP, is the RTL Masters of Formula 3, where Formula Three cars of several national racing series compete with each other (originally called Marlboro Masters, before tobacco advertising ban). A noise restriction order was responsible for this event moving to the Belgian Circuit Zolder for 2007 and 2008. However, the race returned to its historical home in 2009.

Circuit Park Zandvoort played host to the first race in the 2006/07 season of A1 Grand Prix from 29 September–1 October 2006. On 21 August 2008, the official A1GP site reported that the 2008/09 season's first race has moved from the Mugello Circuit, Italy to Zandvoort on the 4–5 October 2008 due to the delay in the building the new chassis for the new race cars. The Dutch round moved to TT Circuit Assen in 2010. A1GP bankrupted before its fifth season and the Dutch round was replaced with Superleague Formula.

In November 2018 reported that Formula One Management (FOM) had invited the owners of the Zandvoort race track to make a proposal to stage a Grand Prix race in 2020. In March 2019, it was confirmed that a letter of intent had been signed between Zandvoort and FOM to stage the Dutch Grand Prix, dependent on private funding being secured to cover the cost of hosting the race. A deadline of 31 March 2019 was set for a final decision to be made. On 14 May 2019 it was confirmed that Zandvoort would host the Dutch Grand Prix for 2020 and beyond for a duration of at least three years, with the option to host another two years beyond that. Several alterations were made to the track to bring it up to date with F1 standards, including adding banking to turn 14 (Arie Luyendijkbocht) and turn 3 (Hugenholtzbocht), but the layout as a whole remained the same. The municipality of Zandvoort invested four million euros into the infrastructure around the circuit to improve the accessibility to the track. On 29 August 2019, the 2020 Dutch Grand Prix at Zandvoort was placed 5th race on the draft schedule, listed on 3 May 2020, between China and Spain. The 2020 scheduled appearance was canceled due to the COVID-19 pandemic, however F1 racing did finally return to the circuit on 5 September 2021. On 17 September 2019, it was announced that Zandvoort would host the FIA Formula 2 Championship and FIA Formula 3 Championship, replacing the series' support races at Circuit Paul Ricard.

The circuit

The circuit gained popularity because of its fast, sweeping corners such as Scheivlak as well as the "Tarzanbocht" (Tarzan corner) hairpin at the end of the start/finish straight. Tarzanbocht is the most famous corner in the circuit. Since there is a camber in the corner, it provides excellent overtaking opportunities. It is possible to pass around the outside as well as the easier inside lane. This corner is reportedly named after a local character who had earned the nickname of Tarzan and only wanted to give up his vegetable garden in the dunes if the track's designers named a nearby corner after him. On the other hand, many different stories about Tarzan Corner are known.

The circuit design has been modified and altered several times:
 1948–1971: length 
 1972–1979: length 
 1980–1989: length 
 1990–1998: length 
 1999–2019: length 
 2020–present: length

Track configurations

The corners are named as follows (the numbers correspond to the present map, starting at the start/finish line):

 Tarzan corner (1)
 Gerlach corner (2)
 Hugenholtz corner (3)
 Hunserug (4)
 Slotemaker corner (5)
 Nameless corner (6)
 Scheivlak (7)
 Masters corner (formerly Marlboro corner) (8)
 Nameless corner (formerly Renault corner) (9)
 CM.com corner (formerly the Vodafone corner) (10)
 Hans Ernst corner 1 and Hans Ernst corner 2 (formerly Audi S corners) (11 + 12)
 Nameless corner (formerly Kumho corner) (13)
 Arie Luyendyk corner (formerly Bos Uit corner) (14)

Turns 3 and 13/14 are extremely cambered corners; turn 3 has a 19-degree bank while turns 13/14 have an 18-degree bank.

Events

 Current

 April: Supercar Challenge Voorjaarsraces, Fun Cup, Paasraces
 May: Historic Zandvoort Trophy, Pinksterraces
 June: Deutsche Tourenwagen Masters, Porsche Carrera Cup Germany, Porsche Carrera Cup Benelux, FIA Masters Historic Formula One Championship Zandvoort Historic Grand Prix, F1 Academy, ADAC GT4 Germany
 July: Eurocup-3 Marcel Albers Memorial Trophy
 August: Formula One Dutch Grand Prix, FIA Formula 2 Championship, Porsche Supercup
 September: Supercar Challenge Trophy of the Dunes
 October: GT World Challenge Europe, Formula Regional European Championship, GB3 Championship, Renault Clio Cup Europe, DMV Goodyear Racing Days, DNRT Finale
 November: 24H van Nederland

 Former

 24H Series 12H Zandvoort (2014–2016)
 ADAC Formel Masters (2012, 2014)
 ADAC Formula 4 (2016, 2019, 2021–2022)
 ADAC GT Masters (2012, 2014–2019, 2021–2022)
 Alpine Elf Europa Cup (2022)
 BMW M1 Procar Championship (1979–1980)
 BOSS GP (2002, 2006, 2009–2014, 2017)
 European Formula 5000 Championship (1969–1970, 1973–1975)
 European Formula Two Championship (1967–1968, 1979–1980)
 European Touring Car Championship (1963–1975, 1977–1979)
 FIA European Formula 3 Championship (1976–1983)
 FIA Formula 3 Championship (2021–2022)
 FIA Formula 3 European Championship (2011–2013, 2015–2018)
 French F4 Championship (2020)
 Formula 3 Euro Series (2003–2012)
 Formula Renault Eurocup (2020)
 RTL GP Masters of F3 (1991–2006, 2009–2016)
 SMP F4 Championship (2016)
 Super Tourenwagen Cup (1994)
 TCR Europe Touring Car Series (2021)
 World Touring Car Championship FIA WTCC Race of the Netherlands (2007)
 World Touring Car Cup FIA WTCR Race of the Netherlands (2018–2019)
 W Series (2021)

Lap records
The official lap record for the current circuit layout is 1:11.097, set by Lewis Hamilton driving for Mercedes in the 2021 Dutch Grand Prix. The all-time fastest official track record set during a race weekend for the current Grand Prix Circuit layout is 1:08.885, set by Max Verstappen during qualifying for the aforementioned Grand Prix. The official race lap records at the Circuit Zandvoort are listed as:

Fatal accidents
In the history of the circuit, several fatal accidents have occurred.

Cycling and running competitions

Motor racer Willy Koppen was the first woman to participate in motor trials in the early fifties on the circuit. In August 1959 the UCI Road World Championships men's race was held at Zandvoort. André Darrigade of France won the  race, Tom Simpson (Britain) was 4th.
In 1994 a large interregional amateur race cycling race was organised by HSV De Kampioen in Haarlem. 
Since 2008, the course has been used as the venue for the Runner's World Zandvoort Circuit Run, a 5-kilometre road running competition. The 2010 edition of the race attracted Lornah Kiplagat, a multiple world champion, who won the ladies 5 km race.

The Cycling Zandvoort 24h race was first held on 25–26 May 2013. It is open for public for soloists and teams up to 8 riders. A 6-hours was added to the event in 2016. On 13./14. June 2015 (12:00) the Cycling Zandvoort – 24 hour race over 4307-m-laps took place.

See also 
 List of Formula One circuits

References

External links 

 Official website (in Dutch and English)
 RacingCircuits.info's history of Circuit Park Zandvoort
 Aerial photo (Google Maps)

Zandvoort
Zandvoort
Zandvoort
Dutch Grand Prix
Motorsport venues in North Holland
Sport in Zandvoort